Mike Deane (born September 27, 1951) is an American college basketball coach who most recently was a men's assistant coach at James Madison University. He retired at the end of the 2017 basketball season. He was previously head basketball coach at Wagner College and was relieved of his duties on March 1, 2010, after which he took a two-year hiatus from the game. He had also held the head coach position at Siena College, Marquette University, and Lamar University.

Deane is from Rockland County, New York, and attended Potsdam State University, where he was a small college All-American and began his career as a coach in 1974. He later coached at Oswego State and had his first Division 1 position at Michigan State University and his first job as head coach at Siena, from 1986 to 1994. He recorded his 400th career victory on December 15, 2007 against the University of Maryland Eastern Shore. He has coached three different Division I schools to the NCAA Tournament (Siena, Marquette, and Lamar). His Siena team upset Stanford in the 1989 NCAA Tournament in the first round of the East Region.

Deane has produced two NBA products in his career (both at Marquette: Chris Crawford and Amal McCaskill).

Head coaching record

References

1951 births
Living people
American men's basketball coaches
American men's basketball players
Basketball coaches from New York (state)
Basketball players from New York (state)
James Madison Dukes men's basketball coaches
Lamar Cardinals basketball coaches
Marquette Golden Eagles men's basketball coaches
Michigan State Spartans men's basketball coaches
Milwaukee Bucks draft picks
People from Stony Point, New York
Siena Saints men's basketball coaches
SUNY Potsdam Bears men's basketball players
Wagner Seahawks men's basketball coaches